Marian Nixon (born Marja Nissinen; October 20, 1904 – February 13, 1983) was an American film actress. Sometimes credited as Marion Nixon, she appeared in more than 70 films.

Career
Born in Superior, Wisconsin, to parents of Finnish descent, Nixon began her career as a teen dancing in choruses in vaudeville. She began appearing in bit part in films in 1922 and landed her first substantial role in the 1923 film Cupid's Fireman opposite Buck Jones. The following year, she was named a WAMPAS Baby Star. Nixon continued to work steadily throughout the mid to late 1920s appearing in Riders of the Purple Sage (1925), Hands Up! (1926), and The Chinese Parrot (1927). In 1929, she made her talkie debut as the lead in Geraldine. Later that same year, Nixon appeared opposite Al Jolson in Say It with Songs followed by General Crack in 1930. In 1931, Nixon's Beauty Arts Institute moved into the Equitable Building of Hollywood; Nixon was president of the company.

In 1932, she starred as Rebecca in the film adaption of Rebecca of Sunnybrook Farm with Ralph Bellamy. Following the release of Rebecca, Nixon co-starred in Winner Take All with James Cagney. The next year she had a supporting role in John Ford's Pilgrimage. In 1934, Nixon attempted to change her wholesome image with a role in the comedy We’re Rich Again. The film was not a success and, after appearing in eight more films, Nixon retired from acting in 1936. She made her last film, Captain Calamity, at the age of 32.

Personal life
Nixon was married four times. She married boxer Joseph Benjamin in 1925, but they divorced two years later. Then, on August 11, 1929, Nixon married Chicago department store heir Edward Hillman Jr. at his parents' home. That union ended in 1933. The following year, Nixon wed director William A. Seiter with whom she had worked on the film We're Rich Again. Their marriage lasted until Seiter's death in 1964 and produced three children: Christopher Seiter, Selena, and Jessica. Finally, on April 1, 1972 in Los Angeles, she married actor/producer Ben Lyon, although her obituary in the Chicago Tribune reports that she married Lyon in 1971.

Her grandsons are the screenwriters Ted Griffin and Nicholas Griffin, the sons of a daughter Nixon had with husband William Seiter.

Death
Nixon died at Cedars-Sinai Medical Center of complications following open heart surgery on February 13, 1983. and is buried at Forest Lawn Memorial Park, Glendale, California.

Recognition
For her contribution to the motion picture industry, Nixon has a star on the Hollywood Walk of Fame at 1724 Vine Street in Los Angeles, California. It was dedicated on February 8, 1960.

Filmography

References

External links

 
 
 
 Photographs of Marian Nixon
 

1904 births
1983 deaths
People from Superior, Wisconsin
American people of Finnish descent
Actresses from Wisconsin
American film actresses
American silent film actresses
Burials at Forest Lawn Memorial Park (Glendale)
Vaudeville performers
Western (genre) film actresses
American television actresses
American female dancers
American stage actresses
20th-century American actresses
WAMPAS Baby Stars
20th-century American dancers